Brent Cross Cricklewood is a new town centre development under construction in Hendon and Cricklewood, London, United Kingdom. The development is planned to cost around £4.5 billion to construct and will include 6,700 homes, workspace for 25,000 people, four parks, transport improvements and a  extension of Brent Cross Shopping Centre. The developers of the scheme are Hammerson and Standard Life.

Construction was planned to start in 2018 and be completed in 2021–22, but in March 2018 a delay was announced to January 2019.

In July 2018 it was reported that the shopping centre would be delayed indefinitely.
In March 2019, the government granted over £300 million to Brent Council to deliver the new station and other infrastructure necessary for the development. In November 2019, the developers and the council agreed a new timetable in which the shopping centre expansion would come later in the development. Construction began in 2020, with the first residential buildings planned to complete in 2024.

History
In 2003, planning permission for a 27,000 sq m extension to the shopping centre alone was rejected by the Office of the Deputy Prime Minister, because of its over reliance on car transport, and because sentiment had moved away from "out-of-town" shopping centres – which Brent Cross was considered to be.

Brent Cross has been designated by the Mayor of London in his London Plan as a 'proposed opportunity area'.

In a renewed effort to improve the area, the London Borough of Barnet approved a "Brent Cross, Cricklewood and West Hendon Development Framework" plan in 2004. This was to redevelop the whole Brent Cross district on both sides of the North Circular Road, not just the shopping centre. There would be more shops (retaining the old shopping centre), but also extensive new housing and offices, and attempts would also be made to regenerate West Hendon and Cricklewood.

The document stated that, 

The local planning authority's estimate of "29,100 additional vehicles" (for a 12-hour weekday period) has been a mobilising issue for local environmental, transport and residential groups, in their opposition to the planned redevelopment.

The plans were jointly promoted by the Greater London Authority, the major land owners, developers and the local authority, and became Supplementary Planning Guidance, and incorporated into Barnet's Unitary Development Plan. Since then, redevelopment of the West Hendon housing area, further north on the A5 road, has been dealt with separately.

The Brent Cross developers are the owners of Brent Cross shopping centre (Hammerson and Standard Life Investments. Barnet Council owns the freehold of the shopping centre, and much of the land to the south of the North Circular Road.

Planning application 2008–2009
In March 2008 the developers presented and published a new planning application, partly in outline and without the required transport assessment which was to follow shortly. When that appeared in November 2008 Barnet Council extended the deadline for comments and objections. (A planning application of this size requires the approval of the local borough and the Mayor of London, and can also be reviewed by the Secretary of State for the Environment). The Greater London Authority's report included criticisms and challenges from Transport for London. The London boroughs of Brent and Camden, whose roads border the development area, formally objected. Although the planning application stresses the importance of walking, cycling and public transport, specialist organisations such as the London Cycling Campaign and the Campaign for Better Transport also objected. Local residents and Friends of the Earth objected to the proposals for a new waste facility on the edge of the development and a coalition of objectors Coalition for a Sustainable Brent Cross Cricklewood was formed.

Consequently, the developers added supplementary documents to the application; Barnet Council again extended the deadline for objections and twice postponed the committee meeting to consider the application. The council officers formally recommended approval of the application and the planning committee approved it on 19 November 2009. The Council issued planning consent on 26 October 2010.

The developers first made their plans for the development public in October 2006. Planning proposals for the development were submitted to Barnet London Borough Council on 25 March 2008. In March 2009 Mayor of London Boris Johnson signalled his support in principle to the development, subject to certain concerns regarding the design, social housing and transport links being addressed. The scheme received outline planning permission from Barnet London Borough Council on 20 November 2009. On 16 March 2010 the then Secretary of State for Communities and Local Government John Denham issued a 'stop notice' directing Barnet London Borough Council not to grant planning permission to Brent Cross Cricklewood without specific authorisation. In June 2010 it was announced that the Secretary of State for Communities and Local Government Eric Pickles would not be recommending the holding of a public inquiry for the development.

Construction
Preparatory works, such as demolition of the old industrial estate, water supply and drainage, began in 2020.

The Exploratory Park, a new public park, opened in August 2020. In October 2020, the developers Argent Related released their plans for the new town, including facilities for sport and play, pedestrian-friendly routes and being a net zero carbon town by 2030.

The first residential buildings are planning to finish construction in 2024.

Transport

An investment of around £500 million in transport infrastructure is planned as part of the development, including:

A new bridge over the A406
The redevelopment of Brent Cross bus station
The redevelopment of Brent Cross Underground Station
The redevelopment of Cricklewood railway station
A new Brent Cross West railway station
Redevelopment of the Staples Corner junction
A new junction with the A5 and a new link bridge over the road
A new junction with the A41
The construction of five new pedestrian bridges

See also

Coalition for a Sustainable Brent Cross Cricklewood
King's Cross Central
Stratford City

References

External links
Barnet London Borough Council
Transforming Brent Cross

Redevelopment projects in London
Cricklewood